Elena Tarrats Gómez (Barcelona, Spain; 19 December 1993) is a Spanish stage, television and film actress and singer.

Biography 
Born in Barcelona in 1993, Tarrats studied an intermediate degree in musical theater at the Memory School in Barcelona. She has also taken several courses in singing, dance and musical language.

She began her professional career as part of the musical group SP3, of the children's channel Club Super3 of TV3; where she worked until 2011. Her first fixed character in a television series was that of Gemma Fernández in the TV3 series Ventdelplà, where she participated in the last two seasons and where she coincided with Carlos Cuevas, Llorenç González and Lluïsa Mallol.

In cinema she made her debut in Ventura Pons' film Mil Cretinos, where she played María. In 2011 she had her first role on national television with the character of Catalina in the Antena 3 period drama Antena 3 Gran Hotel. Other supporting roles followed in Cuéntame cómo pasó, Familia: manual de supervivencia and 39+1.

Despite having participated in numerous audiovisual projects, Tarrats has developed much of her career in theater. In 2017s she participated in L'ànec salvatge, by Norwegian playwright Henrik Ibsen directed by Julio Manrique at the Teatre Lliure in Barcelona. In 2018 she worked with the Catalan company Dagoll Dagom in the play Maremar, a musical with texts by William Shakespeare, music by Lluís Llach and with the situation of refugees in southeastern Europe as a common thread.

Filmography

Theater 
{| class="wikitable"
!Year
!Title
!Directed by
!Dramaturgy
!Notes
|-
| rowspan="2" |2011–2012
|Dreamin' and rappin'''
|Moisés Maicas
|
|
|-
|Límits|Miguel Ángel Raió
|Marta Solé
|
|-
| rowspan="2" |2012–2013
|El último día de febrero|Míriam Escurriola
|La Hydra (Elena Tarrats and Marc Oller)
|
|-
|Tot és fum. L'amor en cinc intents|Míriam Escurriola
|
|Grec Festival 2013
|-
| rowspan="3" |2014
|Generació de merda (Un musical de llum i color)|
|Xavi Morató and Gerard Sesé
|
|-
|Si quieres dulce no pidas calamares|
|David Pintó
|
|-
|Campamentos|
|David Pintó
|
|-
|2014–2016
|Mar i cel|Dagoll Dagom
|Ángel Guimerá
|
|-
|2015
|Joc de miralls|Juan Carlos Martel
|Annie Baker
|
|-
| rowspan="2" |2016
|Si au Si|Marjorie Currenti
|La Gran Troupe
|Temporada Alta Festival 2016
|-
|L'Avar|Josep María Mestres
|Molière
|
|-
|2017
|L'ànec salvatge|Julio Manrique
|Henrik Ibsen
|
|-
|2018
|Maremar|Dagoll Dagom
|William Shakespeare
|
|-
|
|El llibertí|Joan Lluís Bozzo
|
|
|}

 Television 

 Cinema 

 2014: Ningú no pot somiar per tu, by Sergi Cervera.
 2013: Barcelona, noche de verano, by Dani de la Orden.
 2012: La verdadera historia de Caperucita Roja y el lobo ¿feroz?, by Dídac Cervera. Short film.
 2011: Mil cretinos (2011), by Ventura Pons.

 Discografía 

 Ma. El poder de decidir (2013): Her first solo album, together with pianist Yamini T. Prabhu.
 Cantos de poeta'' (2016): First album by Gelria, Galician music trio.

References

External links 
 

Actresses from Barcelona
Spanish stage actresses
Spanish television actresses
Spanish film actresses
21st-century Spanish actresses
Living people
1993 births